Organ Pipes or The Organ Pipes may refer to:

 Organ pipes, the sound-producing element of the pipe organ
 Organ Pipes (New Zealand), a feature of Mount Cargill
 Organ Pipes (Namibia), a rock formation
 Organ Pipes National Park, in Victoria, Australia
 The Organ Pipes (Antarctica), a rock formation in Queen Elizabeth Land

See also
 
 Organ pipe coral (Tubipora musica)
 Stenocereus thurberi, organ pipe cactus